Die Juden (English: The Jews) is German-language play by Gotthold Ephraim Lessing. Written in 1749 in Berlin it was staged 1754. Like the same author's Nathan der Weise the play pleads for religious tolerance and is generally seen as sympathetic to the Jewish people.

References

1754 plays
Fictional Jews
Israel in fiction
Philosemitism
Plays by Gotthold Ephraim Lessing